Hellinsia monserrate is a moth of the family Pterophoridae. It is found in Colombia.</ref>

References

Moths described in 1995
monserrate
Moths of South America
Endemic fauna of Colombia